Myakovsky may refer to:

 Nikolai Myaskovsky (1881-1950), Russian Composer 
 Vladimir Mayakovsky (1883-1930), Russian Poet